Oberhuber is a surname. Notable people with the surname include:

Günter Oberhuber (born 1954), Austrian ice hockey player
Hans-Peter Oberhuber (born 1962), German speed skater
Oswald Oberhuber (1931–2020), Austrian painter, sculptor, and graphic artist
Veronika Oberhuber (born 1967), Italian luger